Cartopia is a food cart pod (lot of many food trucks) located on the corner of SE 12th Avenue and Hawthorne Boulevard in South East Portland, Oregon. It is the home of Potato Champion, Perierra Creperie, Pyro Pizza, El Brasero, Tahrir Square, and Chicken and Guns, which was featured on the Travel Channel's Man v. Food, hosted by Casey Webb in 2017.

References

External links

 

Buckman, Portland, Oregon
Food carts in Portland, Oregon